Hocus Corpus is a crime novel by the American writer James N. Tucker set in 1990s Pittsburgh, Pennsylvania.

It tells the story of Dr. Jack Merlin, now chief resident of surgery, still a part-time magician and sleuth, who is mysteriously losing patients after routine surgery at the University of Pittsburgh Medical Center.

Sources
Contemporary Authors Online. The Gale Group, 2006. PEN (Permanent Entry Number):  0000142340.

External links
  Pittsburgh Post-Gazette book review

1999 American novels
American crime novels
Novels set in Pittsburgh
University of Pittsburgh